Katherine Bobak (born August 8, 1994) is a Canadian pair skater. With Ian Beharry, she is the 2011 JGP Final silver medalist and the 2012 Canadian national junior champion. With Matthew Penasse, she is the 2009 Canadian national novice champion and two-time (2010–2011) Canadian junior bronze medalist.

Career 
Early in her career, Bobak competed with Matthew Penasse. They competed once on the JGP series, are the 2009 Canadian National Novice Pair Champions and won two national bronze medals on the junior level.

Bobak teamed up with Ian Beharry on February 12, 2011. In the 2011–12 season, they won silver at their first Junior Grand Prix event in Poland and gold at their second event in Estonia, earning a berth to the 2011–12 Junior Grand Prix Final. They won the silver medal at the event and set a new Canadian junior pair record with their score of 152.65 points. Bobak and Beharry then won the 2012 Canadian Junior Championships. They finished 7th at the 2012 World Junior Championships. In April 2012, Bobak and Beharry ended their partnership.

Programs

With Beharry

With Penasse

Competitive highlights

With Beharry

With Penasse

References

External links 

 
 

1994 births
Canadian female pair skaters
Living people
Sportspeople from Guelph